Lethrinops albus is a species of cichlid endemic to Lake Malawi where it occurs in deep waters.  This species grows to a length of  TL.  It can also be found in the aquarium trade.

References

albus
Taxa named by Charles Tate Regan
Fish described in 1922
Taxonomy articles created by Polbot